Geek shows were an act in traveling carnivals and circuses of early America and were often part of a larger sideshow.

The billed performer's act consisted of a single geek, who stood in the center ring to chase live chickens. It ended with the performer biting the chickens' heads off and swallowing them. The geek shows were often used as openers for what are commonly known as freak shows. It was a matter of pride among circus and carnival professionals not to have traveled with a troupe that included geeks.  Geeks were often alcoholics or drug addicts, and paid with liquor – especially during Prohibition – or with narcotics. In modern usage, the term "geek show" is often applied to situations where an audience is drawn to a performance or show where the performance consists of a horrific act that the crowd finds distasteful but ultimately entertaining. It may also be used by a single person in reference to an experience that he or she found humiliating but others found entertaining.

References in pop culture

Freaks (1932) is a horror film with a long history of controversy because it used real carnival performers. In its original release, it became the only M-G-M film ever to be pulled from cinemas before completing its domestic engagements.

In the film noir classic Nightmare Alley (1947), based on the 1946 novel of the same name by William Lindsay Gresham, Tyrone Power plays a sideshow barker in a seedy carnival which includes a geek biting the heads off live chickens. Power's character later succeeds as a charlatan mentalist, but then descends into alcoholism and is reduced to falsely portraying a geek as a means of survival in another sideshow. In one of Gresham's non-fiction books, Monster Midway, he further details the process of making an alcoholic or a drug addict perform a geek act in exchange for a fix.

Bob Dylan's "Ballad of a Thin Man", from the 1965 album Highway 61 Revisited, makes a reference to the geek in its third verse. It is directed at the 'straight' Mr Jones, who is unable to come to terms with the counter-culture youth revolution around him:
You hand in your ticket
And you go watch the geek
Who immediately walks up to you
When he hears you speak
And says, "How does it feel
To be such a freak?"
And you say, "Impossible"
As he hands you a bone.

In the 1975 Robertson Davies novel World of Wonders, the narrator, Paul, tells how as a boy he was kidnapped and molested by a Willard, a carnival magician. Paul eventually becomes a world-famous illusionist, while Willard is reduced to geeking.

In the television show Starsky and Hutch (1976), Huggy tells Starsky and Hutch that the guy they are looking for, Monty Voorhees, used to be a geek. Starsky explains geeks to Hutch. He also claims that the geeks formed a union in 1932, which he then admits he made up. "Well, suppose all they paid you in was chicken heads." (“Bounty Hunter”, Season 1, Episode 22)

The artist Joe Coleman bit the heads off white rats as part of his stage act as Doctor Momboozo in the 1980s. He primarily did a 'Human Bomb' show, self-detonating at the end, but also performed with the rodents for his turn as a geek.

The 1990 Troma film Luther the Geek revolves around a geek named Luther, who eventually becomes a murderer who bites the heads off his victims.
A geek show figures in the Katherine Dunn novel Geek Love (1989).  Crystal Lil, the debutante mother of the freaks, met their father while performing as a geek during her summer break from university. Aloysius, the proprietor of the traveling circus, comments that college boys often toured as geeks during their summer breaks, but at the sight of the lovely Crystal Lil and her eagerness they made an exception. During a recounting of her time as a geek, Crystal remarks on how damaged her teeth were from biting the heads off chickens.

In the 1993 Beavis and Butt-Head episode "At the Sideshow", Beavis and Butt-Head go to a carnival, run afoul of the staff, and are forced to join the sideshow as Siamese twin chicken geeks.

In the 1995 X-Files episode "Humbug", real-life sideshow performer The Enigma portrays a mostly-mute geek named "The Conundrum."  True to the classical view of circus or even other sideshow performers about them, one of the sideshow workers calls The Conundrum "neither highly trained nor professional, just...unseemly."  In true geek form, The Conundrum's willingness to eat anything plays a crucial role in resolving the episode's plot.

In the 1998 Simpsons episode "Bart Carny", Homer and Bart are asked to perform in a geek show to pay off a debt: "You just bite the heads off the chickens and take a bow".

In Marvel Noir, Norman Osborn has his henchmen all employed from various sideshow attractions. Adrian Toomes was a former Geek, and seems to have lost all conscience, as he devoured Ben Parker.

In the film The Wizard of Gore there is a show that opens with "The Geek" (played by Jeffrey Combs) eating maggots and then biting the head off a rat.

In the first two episodes of American Horror Story: Freak Show, there is a geek named Meep (played by Ben Woolf) who performs in the Freak Show biting heads off of baby chickens. He is eventually wrongfully arrested and murdered by the other inmates in prison.

In HBO's 2003 television series Carnivàle, Ben Hawkins' father, Henry Scudder, deserted the Austro-Hungarian Army and fled to America where he eventually succumbed to alcoholism and worked as a sideshow geek at Hyde and Teller's carnival.

References

External links
detailed article on the Circus Geeks

Circuses
Sideshows
Cruelty to animals
Alcohol abuse